Henry Barley (1487–1529) was an English politician.

Henry Barley may also refer to:

Henry Barley,  High Sheriff of Essex in 1466
Sir Henry Barley, ( 1876) in Colony of Natal